Pehr Götrek (1798 – 1876) was an early Swedish Christian communist. He was also a teetotaler and a vegetarian.

Götrek was born in a village in Södermanland. After graduating from high school, he moved to Stockholm in 1818 and became a teacher, a book printer and also kept an antiquarian bookshop in Södermalm. He published books explaining Saint-Simon's "revealed religion" in the 1830s, then turning his focus towards Étienne Cabet in 1846 and in 1847 he wrote a book expounding on Charles Fourier. He was the first to import and translate the Communist Manifesto by Karl Marx and Friedrich Engels, in 1848, the same year it was published in German. , or "People's voice is God's voice"). He also wrote several works criticising the developing capitalist society from a Christian perspective.

He had a small group of intellectual followers and the group became an underground club for political discussions, but never really any practical political work. Even though Götrek read Marx, he was more of a utopian socialist than a revolutionary Marxist.

The Communist Manifesto was later more accurately retranslated by Axel Danielsson, and then Zeth Höglund.

References

External source
 Project Runeberg, Nordisk familjebok: Göthlin – Götrek 

Swedish communists
Christian communists
Utopian socialists
1789 births
1876 deaths
People from Södermanland
Swedish Christian socialists